Charles O. Stockslager was a justice of the Idaho Supreme Court from 1901 to 1906, serving as chief justice from 1901 to 1902.

In 1905, Stockslager wrote an early environmentally conscious opinion, holding that mining companies had no right to dump "debris and poisonous substances" in waters with downstream users.

Stockslager was also a Democratic candidate for Governor of Idaho in 1906, and in pursuit of that effort, traveled to Caldwell, Idaho, in the wake of the assassination of Governor Frank Steunenberg there, in order to take advantage of the high public profile to be gained from appearing to be involved in the investigation. He also ran for U.S. Senate in 1909.

References

20th-century American judges
Justices of the Idaho Supreme Court
Year of birth missing
Year of death missing
Chief Justices of the Idaho Supreme Court